Medionidus is a genus of freshwater mussels, aquatic bivalve mollusks in the family Unionidae.

Species within the genus Medionidus
 Medionidus acutissimus (Alabama moccasinshell)
 Medionidus conradicus
 Medionidus parvulus (Coosa moccasinshell)
 Medionidus penicillatus (gulf moccasinshell)
 Medionidus simpsonianus (Ochlockonee moccasinshell)
 Medionidus walkeri

 
Bivalve genera
Taxonomy articles created by Polbot